SS Cuxhaven was a cargo ship built for the Yorkshire Coal and Steamship Company in 1882.

History

The ship was built by William Thompson of Dundee, Scotland, for the Yorkshire Coal and Steamship Company and launched on 6 May 1882.

On 20 April 1886 she was in collision with the Manchester Wholesale Co-operative Society steamer Progress, which left a breach in the Cuxhaven′s stokehold. Cuxhaven was beached. She was salvaged by the Dundee Salvage Company early in May which required the removal of 300 tons of mud.

In 1895 Cuxhaven was acquired by the Goole Steam Shipping Company. In 1905 she was acquired by the Lancashire and Yorkshire Railway. She was sold in 1910 to G. Sfilio, Cantania and renamed Torero. In 1912 she was sold to R. Randaffo, Catania and the firm became the Society Transport Internazionali Marittimi. Her crew survived.

References

1882 ships
Steamships of the United Kingdom
Ships built in Dundee
Ships of the Lancashire and Yorkshire Railway
Maritime incidents in April 1886
Maritime incidents in 1916
Ships sunk by German submarines in World War I
World War I shipwrecks in the Mediterranean Sea